Aniston is a surname. Notable people with the surname include:

 Nicole Aniston, adult film actress 
 Jennifer Aniston (born 1969), American actress
 John Aniston (1933–2022), Greek-American actor
 Aniston Fernandes (born 1993), Indian footballer

See also
 Anniston (disambiguation)